Estadio Municipal Roberto Bravo Santibáñez is a multi-use stadium in Melipilla, Chile.  It is currently used mostly for football matches and is the home stadium of Deportes Melipilla. The stadium holds 6,500 people and was built in 1942.

Roberto Bravo Santibanez
Municipal Roberto Bravo Santibanez
1942 establishments in Chile
Sports venues completed in 1942